James Max Neuberger (born 4 November 1949) is a consultant physician, Queen Elizabeth Hospital, Birmingham, part of University Hospitals Birmingham NHS Foundation Trust, and professor of medicine at the University of Birmingham. He is one of the editors of the journal Transplantation and is Associate Medical Director (Organ Donation and Transplantation) of NHS Blood and Transplant.

Education
Neuberger was educated at Westminster School and Christ Church, Oxford from where he obtained his MA, BM, BCh and DM.

Personal life
He is the son of Prof. Albert Neuberger, the brother of Prof. Michael Neuberger, Prof. Anthony Neuberger, and David Neuberger, Baron Neuberger of Abbotsbury (President of the Supreme Court of the United Kingdom), and the brother-in-law of Julia Neuberger.

References

 James Neuberger -Editor. Transplantation (journal). Retrieved 2011-03-02.

Footnotes

1949 births
People educated at Westminster School, London
Alumni of Christ Church, Oxford
20th-century British biologists
21st-century British biologists
English Jews
Jewish scientists
Living people
James
Academics of the University of Birmingham
English people of German-Jewish descent